Souq Wadi Barada also spelled Suq Wadi Barada is a Syrian village in the Al-Zabadani District of the Rif Dimashq Governorate. According to the Syria Central Bureau of Statistics (CBS), Souq Wadi Barada had a population of 3,678 in the 2004 census. Its inhabitants are predominantly Sunni Muslims.

See also
 Siege of Wadi Barada
 Abila Lysaniou

References

Bibliography

Populated places in Al-Zabadani District